Sheikha Hind bint Hamad Al Thani (born 15 August 1984) is a Qatari royal.

Education
Sheikha Hind holds a bachelor's degree from Duke University in the United States, a master's degree in human rights from University College London, and an International EMBA from HEC Paris in Qatar.

Career
She was Co-Chairperson of the Joint Advisory Board of Northwestern University in Qatar, a partner of Hamad Bin Khalifa University (HBKU); vice chair of Qatar Foundation board of directors; member of the board of trustees of Qatar Foundation; vice chairperson and chairperson of the executive committee of the Supreme Education Council (now the Ministry of Education and Higher Education), and member of the Governing Council of Interpeace.  During the years 2008 to 2013, she was director of His Highness the Amir's Office. Concurrently, she held the posts of chairperson of the joint oversight board and chairperson of the executive committee of the College of the North Atlantic Qatar. She is vice chairperson and CEO of Qatar Foundation for Education, Science and Community Development (QF), which was founded by her parents Hamad bin Khalifa Al Thani and Moza bint Nasser Al-Missned.

Personal life
She married Sheikh Faisal bin Thani Al Thani on 2 April 2010 in the Al-Wajbah Palace, Doha. They have 5 sons and 1 daughter.

In September 2021, at the ITU World Triathlon Series event in Hamburg, Sheikha Hind completed her first Olympic distance triathlon.

Ancestry

References

External links
 H.E. Sheikha Hind Bint Hamad Al Thani

1984 births
Living people
House of Thani
Qatari royalty
Education in Qatar
Qatar Foundation people
Daughters of monarchs
Duke University alumni